Robert Henrion (23 July 1915 – 19 June 1997) was a Belgian politician. He was Minister of Finance from 1966 to 1968, and in 1980. He was also a fencer, and competed in the individual and team épée events at the 1952 Summer Olympics.

References

1915 births
1997 deaths
Finance ministers of Belgium
Belgian male fencers
Belgian épée fencers
Olympic fencers of Belgium
Fencers at the 1952 Summer Olympics
Sportspeople from Namur (city)